Platon is an electronic toll collection system established in Russia in November 2015. The toll is collected from trucks over 12 tons, with the proceedings going to a federal fund for road maintenance. A subsidiary of the state-owned Rostec corporation holds a 50% stake in the collection system operator, with the Putin-associated Rotenberg oligarchs owning the other half.

The objective of the Platon system is to offset the damage caused by heavy trucks to the country's major highways. As of April 2017, road users who drive vehicles included in the scheme are required to pay a levy of 1.90 rubles ($0.03) per kilometer. Rosavtodor, the Russian federal agency for road transport, asserts that 58% of the damage to roads is caused by heavy trucks. Revenues from the system amounted to 22 billion rubles in 2016. As of November 2018, the cumulative revenue was 789 million Euros.

History
Originally scheduled for launch in 2013, the first detailed technical study for the implementation of the nationwide truck tolling system envisioned the construction of microwave-based gantries on all road segments of all major highways in Russia, similar to the system implemented in Austria in 2004. Once it was decided to implement the system using GNSS road pricing rather than an infrastructure-based solution, the tolled road network applied to all the National Roads for a total length of 50,000 km - making it the largest single tolling system in the world.

Controversy
The implementation of the system sparked protest among truck drivers across Russia, especially in the Dagestan region. Most truckers in Russia own and operate their vehicles as independent contractors, and many fear the levy will render their business unprofitable. According to independent Russian media, the operation of the Platon system is considered to be unfair and ineffective, with reports that up to 70% of the trucks avoid paying the distance-based fees.

See also 
 Vignette (road tax)

References

External links
 Official website

Electronic toll collection
Politics of Russia
Rostec
Road transport in Russia